A Mitzvah tank is a vehicle used by the Orthodox Jewish practitioners of Chabad-Lubavitch Hasidism as a portable "educational and outreach center" and "mini-synagogue" (or "minagogue") to reach out to non-observant and alienated Jews.  Mitzvah tanks have been commonplace on the streets of New York City since 1974. Today they are found all over the globe in countries where Chabad is active.

Terminology 
The word Mitzvah means a "commandment" of the Torah in Judaism, but also carries with it the connotation of a good deed. Lubavitchers use these vehicles to spread the teachings of Judaism to the Jewish masses in "military fashion" in which "campaigns" and battles are fought, hence naming the vans and trucks "tanks".

The strategy behind the Mitzvah tank "campaigns" was designed and encouraged by the seventh rebbe of Chabad Lubavitch, Rabbi Menachem Mendel Schneerson .

Appearance and description 
Mitzvah tanks can be vans, travel trailers, recreational vehicles, campervan or pickup trucks.  On Sukkot, vehicles may be fitted with a portable Sukkah (the Sukkah-mobile). Mitzvah tanks are put into operation on the eve of major Jewish holidays and Fridays prior to Shabbat. The vehicles often have large banners or logos on them, extolling some aspect of Judaism or displaying images of Rabbi Schneerson and about Moshiach's imminent arrival. Some Mitzvah Tanks have external speakers attached which are used to play klezmer-style music. The tanks, usually manned by young male Lubavitch students in the Yeshiva of Tomchei Temimim, park in areas with heavy people-traffic and seek Jews to perform Mitzvahs by asking passers-by: "Are you Jewish?"

Purpose 
Lubavitchers manning the tank will usually hand out brochures or cards with information about performing mitzvot and about the coming of Moshiach. They encourage passersby to perform mitzvot with an emphasis on those part of the Chabad mitzvah campaigns, and assist those who are willing to perform religious rituals, such as the putting on of Tefillin (phylacteries) with men and boys over Bar Mitzvah, and hand out candles and candle-lighting information to women and girls to light in honor of the Shabbat. In addition, during the holiday of Chanukah many Menorahs with candles are given out allowing people to bring the light of Chanukah into their own home, all in bringing the ultimate Moshiach closer. Some Mitzvah Tanks have traditional foods, like doughnuts, on board during that holiday as well.

Gallery

References

External links

Official website for the Mitzvah Tanks in NY
Official website for the Mitzvah Tank in Israel
History of the Mitzvah Tank

Chabad outreach
Menachem Mendel Schneerson
Vehicles by purpose